†Omalaxidae is an extinct family of sea snails, marine gastropod molluscs in the clade Littorinimorpha.

References 

 The Taxonomicon

Prehistoric gastropods